was an officer and ace fighter pilot in the Imperial Japanese Navy (IJN) during the Second Sino-Japanese War and the Pacific theater of World War II.  In aerial combat over China and the Pacific, he was officially credited with destroying nine enemy aircraft.

At the outbreak of the Pacific War, as a member of the aircraft carrier Sōryū's fighter group, Oda participated in the Attack on Pearl Harbor, the Indian Ocean Raid, and the Battle of Midway.  After serving almost a year in the reserves in Japan, Oda returned to active service in April 1944 and saw front line aviation duty in the Mariana Islands and at Truk.  At Truk in late 1944, Oda embarked on the submarine I-365 to return to mainland Japan.  On 29 November 1944, the submarine was sunk in the Bonin Islands with all hands, including Oda.

References

1913 births
1944 deaths
Japanese naval aviators
Japanese World War II flying aces
Military personnel from Niigata Prefecture
Japanese military personnel killed in World War II
Imperial Japanese Navy officers